The 1921–22 season is the 48th season of competitive football by Rangers.

Overview
Rangers played a total of 49 competitive matches during the 1921–22 season. The team finished second in the league, one point behind champions Celtic, after just winning twenty-eight of the 42 league games.

The side also reached the final of the Scottish Cup that season, beating the likes of Clachnacuddin and Partick Thistle en route to a 1–0 defeat at the hands of Greenock Morton.

Results
All results are written with Rangers' score first.

Scottish League Division One

Scottish Cup

Appearances

See also
 1921–22 in Scottish football
 1921–22 Scottish Cup
 Lord Provost's Rent Relief Cup

Rangers F.C. seasons
Rangers